Mountain America Credit Union is a federally chartered credit union headquartered in Sandy, Utah, regulated under the authority of the National Credit Union Administration (NCUA). Mountain America Credit Union is the second largest credit union in Utah. It is also the 12th largest credit union nationally by membership and the 24th largest by total assets. As of December 2021, Mountain America had $14 billion in assets, 1,033,000 members, and over 95 branches.

History
After a 5% tax was proposed on the three largest credit unions in Utah, Mountain America converted from a state chartered to a federally chartered credit union in 2003, becoming Mountain America Federal Credit Union. Mountain America's membership is open to residents of Salt Lake, Duchesne, Wasatch, and Uintah counties and their families as well as members of affiliated associations and employees of select employee groups. Some of  their Select Employer Group (SEG) affiliations include some of the world's largest companies and associations, including Marriott International, the National Consumer Council, and Walmart.

Mountain America donated $25,000 through the World Council of Credit Unions to fund relief efforts in Peru after the 2007 earthquake there.

References

https://www.macu.com/about

External links

 

Credit unions based in Utah
Banks established in 1934
1934 establishments in Utah
Sandy, Utah